Reibman is a surname. Notable people with this surname include:
Amy Reibman, American electrical engineer
Jeanette Reibman (1915–2006), American politician
Larry Reibman, American television cinematographer on Hart of Dixie, A Million Little Things, and Pretty Little Liars